= F. polymorpha =

F. polymorpha may refer to:

- Ficus polymorpha, a plant with edible fruit
- Fomitiporia polymorpha, a fungus bearing spores on basidia
